QIC may refer to:

 QIC-United Evangelical Church (Qua Iboe Church), a Christian denomination in Nigeria
 Quarter-inch cartridge, a magnetic tape data storage format
 Queensland Investment Corporation, an investment fund operated by the state government of Queensland  
 Qatar Insurance Company, a Qatari insurance company